Annalise Nicole Basso (born December 2, 1998) is an American actress. She starred in Snowpiercer (2020-2022).

She has starred in the films Bedtime Stories (2008), Love Takes Wing (2009), Standing Up (2013), Oculus (2013), and Ouija: Origin of Evil (2016). From 2014 until 2015, she starred in the television series The Red Road. She graduated from Campbell Hall School in Studio City, Los Angeles.

Life and career
Annalise Basso is the youngest child of Marcia and Louis Joseph Basso, and has an older sister and brother, Alexandria and Gabriel Basso, who are also actors. Most of her initial roles have been on television commercials or small guest appearances on television series. Her first role that garnered attention was her role as Eden Hamby on True Blood. In 2009, she starred in the television film Love Takes Wing from the Love Comes Softly series. When she was 10, she took part in Are You Smarter Than a 5th Grader? as a student. More recently, she has had roles in episodes of New Girl and Nikita.

Basso's first lead role in a feature film was in D. J. Caruso's Standing Up, a coming-of-age story based on the novel The Goats by Brock Cole. The film debuted at the 2012 Cannes Film Festival. The story centers on two children, played by Basso and Chandler Canterbury, who are stripped naked and left stranded together on an island as part of a summercamp prank.

In 2014, she starred in the horror film Oculus as a younger version of Karen Gillan's character. Basso gained greater recognition and attention for the critically successful horror film Ouija: Origin of Evil in 2016.

In 2019, she played Heaven Casteel in series of Lifetime movies based on the Casteel saga by V.C. Andrews.

She starred as LJ Folger in TNT's apocalyptic thriller Snowpiercer, adapted from the movie of the same name.

Filmography

Music videos

Accolades

References

External links

 

Living people
Actresses from St. Louis
American child actresses
Female models from Missouri
American film actresses
American television actresses
21st-century American actresses
1998 births